Gyo-dong is a dong or neighborhood in the city of Gyeongju, North Gyeongsang province, South Korea. It is one of legal dong under its administrative dong, Wolseong-dong's jurisdiction. The name, Gyo-dong originates from the fact that the area has had a hyanggyo, government-managed Confucian academies during the Goryeo and Joseon dynasties. It belonged to Bunae-myeon, Gyeongju County (Gyeongju-gun) during the late period of the Joseon Dynasty. Gyo-dong was variously called Hyanggyotgol, Gyochon or Gyori at the times.

Dorurang Mountain (Dorurangsan) with a height of 95 meter lies across Gyo-dong, and nearby neighborhoods, Inwang-dong, and Tap-dong.

Cultural properties in Gyo-dong include not only tangible heritages such as Gyeongju Hyanggyo (Gyeognju Confucian Academy), Choe Sik's house, Gyeongju Samuso (Gyeongju's local council for government officers), Cheongwan temple site (Cheongwansaji), but also Gyeongju Gyo-dong beopju (a rice wine) to have been designated as Important Intangible Cultural Property.

See also
Yangdong Village of Gyeongju
Hahoe Folk Village

References

Subdivisions of Gyeongju
Neighbourhoods in South Korea

ko:교동 (경주시)